Ste-Anne-du-Nord River is a tributary of the northwest shore of the Saint Lawrence River where it flows at the height of Beaupré. This river flows in Capitale-Nationale, in the province of Quebec, Canada. The river passes through Canyon Sainte-Anne before joining the Saint Lawrence River at Beaupré.

Geography 
Rivière Sainte-Anne is a river in the Capitale-Nationale region. The river finds its source at Lac de la Tour in Grands-Jardins National Park. From there, it flows south and ends at Beaupré, opposite Île d'Orléans, 35 km northeast of Quebec City in the St. Lawrence River.

In Saint-Ferréol-les-Neiges are the Seven Chutes, falls which in many cases are 128 m high. Then the river crosses the Canyon Sainte-Anne, a gorge with a length of 10 km. At its end, in Saint-Joachim is the Sainte-Anne waterfall, 74 m high.

Upper course of the Sainte-Anne river (downstream of Lac de la Tour) (segment of )

  towards the south-east, branching east towards the end of the segment by crossing a first small lake, crossing the route 381, then crossing the Lake at Lizé, to its mouth;

Upper course of the Sainte-Anne river (downstream from Lac Sainte-Anne du Nord) (segment of )

  towards the southwest in a deep valley by collecting the discharge (coming from the east) of the Pointu Lake and the discharge (coming from the northwest) of the Lac du Versant, to the outlet (coming from the north) from Lac à Poux;
  south, to the outlet (coming from the southwest) from Lac Turgeon;
  to the southeast, crossing Lake Arthabaska, crossing Pemmican Lake, up to Wabano Dam;
  south-east almost in a straight line, crossing Lac Troué and Lac Long, crossing the Barrage du Lac-Long, collecting the discharge (coming from the north ) from Buies and Théodule lakes, to a bend in the river; then south in a deep valley curving east to the outlet (coming from the northwest) of Chaudière and Beaupré lakes;
  to the south in a deep valley, collecting the Courganne stream (coming from the west), to the Petit Lac Double stream (coming from the northeast);
  to the south in a deep valley, collecting a river (coming from the west), bending towards the southeast, until the confluence of the rivière Savane du Nord (coming from the south);

Intermediate course of the Sainte-Anne river (downstream of the “rivière Savane du Nord) (segment of )

  towards the south-east in a deep valley, collecting the discharge (coming from the west) from the North-East Lake, until Le Big Creek (coming from the north);
  towards the south-east in a deep valley, then towards the east, up to a bend of the river corresponding to a stream (coming from the north-east);
  to the south, forming a gap towards the east at the start of the segment, then crossing eight series of rapids, up to Petite rivière Savane (coming from the northwest);
  to the south, forming a large S at the start of the segment, crossing five series of rapids, to the outlet (coming from the east) of an unidentified lake;
  to the south by crossing several series of rapids, by collecting the Beaumier stream (coming from the northwest), bypassing two islands, up to a bend of the river, corresponding to the confluence of the Brûlée River (Sainte-Anne River tributary) (coming from the south);

Intermediate course of the Sainte-Anne river (downstream of the Brûlée River) (segment of )

  towards the south-east by forming a large S, bypassing a first island and a second island, to the confluence of the Sables Mountain Creek (coming from the east);
  first towards the east by collecting the discharge (coming from the north) of an unidentified lake, towards the south, then the south-east, crossing series of rapids, to the rivière du Mont Saint-Étienne (coming from the west);
  towards the south-east by crossing a series of rapids at the start of the segment, up to the route 360 bridge;
  south-east, south, then south-east, collecting a stream (coming from the north-west), relatively in a straight line, up to the Lombrette River (from the northeast);
  southwards, bending westwards, to the Sept-Chutes dam;
  towards the south-west by crossing the seven falls (in front of the hamlet "Les Sept-Chutes") and a series of rapids, until the rivière des Roches (coming from the north);

Lower course of the Sainte-Anne river (segment of )

  to the south in a deep valley and crossing several series of rapids, forming a hook towards the east, crossing the Bassin de l'Érablière in mid-segment where it receives a stream (coming from the west), then forming a large curve towards the west, up to the Sainte-Anne Falls corresponding to the confluence of the rivière du Moulin (Sainte-Anne River) (coming from the northwest);
  to the south, forming a large S to bypass the mountains, crossing two series of rapids and collecting the waters of the Jean-Larose River at the end of the segment (coming from the northwest), to a dam;
  towards the south-east by forming a curve towards the north-east, crossing three series of rapids, up to the bridge of the route 138;
  first towards the east, then towards the south bypassing the urban sector of Beaupré, up to the railway bridge;
  towards the south-east by crossing the bay endowed with a marina which serves as a haven for pleasure boats, to its mouth.

The Sainte-Anne river ends at Beaupré, opposite the northern tip of Île d'Orléans, on the northwest shore of the Saint Lawrence river. This mouth is located at:
 35 km northeast of downtown of Quebec City;
  north-east of the bridge connecting the Île d'Orléans to L'Ange-Gardien (Côte-de-Beaupré);
  north-west of Île d'Orléans, crossing the Chenal de l'Île d'Orléans (English: Channel of Île d'Orléans).

Toponymy 
The toponym "Rivière Sainte-Anne" was formalized on April 4, 1982 at the Place Names Bank of the Commission de toponymie du Québec

Sept-Chutes hydroelectric plant 
The Sept-Chutes power plant, a hydroelectric power plant run-of-the-water power plant belonging to Hydro-Québec is on the Sainte-Anne river. It was built in 1916 and modernized in 1999. It has 4 turbines for a total output of 22 MW. The hydraulic potential amounts to 124.97 m. The power station can be visited.

Hydro-Canyon hydroelectric plant 
It was in 2016 that the hydroelectric power station of Société Hydro-Canyon Saint-Joachim started up a hydroelectric power station over water 300 meters upstream from Canyon Sainte-Anne.

The Hydro-Canyon Saint-Joachim run-of-river power plant project was designed taking into account the technical and environmental aspects of the integration environment.

The development will harmonize with the recreotourism facilities of Canyon Sainte-Anne.

The works will optimize the site on the hydroelectric level while developing the potential of the Sainte-Anne waterfall. The maximum power of the plant will be 23.2 MW.

The installation will include:
 A weir threshold to maintain the upstream level of the river
 A spillway
 A water intake
 An entrance gallery
 A power plant including production equipment
 A substation and a power line connecting the site to the Hydro-Québec network

Sport 

The Sainte-Anne-du-Nord river has also been used since 1966 by a club and a river kayak school. First bearing the name of Club Echohamok, it has evolved to bear today the name of Côte-de-Beaupré. It must be said that the Sainte-Anne-du-Nord river has a portion of river located between the Sept-Chutes hydroelectric plant and the Hydro-Canyon hydroelectric plant which is classified 5 stars by the guide of rivers of Quebec.

Notes and references

Appendices

See also 
La Côte-de-Beaupré Regional County Municipality
Lac-Pikauba, un territoire non organisé
Saint-Ferréol-les-Neiges, une municipalité
Saint-Joachim, une municipalité
Beaupré, Quebec, une municipalité
Chenal de l'Île d'Orléans
Grands-Jardins National Park
Laurentides Wildlife Reserve
Canyon Sainte-Anne
St. Lawrence River
List of rivers of Quebec

Rivers of Capitale-Nationale
Tributaries of the Saint Lawrence River